Sole Satisfier is a term in Christian theology which refers to God as the only one who can satisfy human beings.

Saints

Cyprian
Cyprian is one of the Fathers of the Church.

To those who seek the kingdom of God and his righteousness, he has promised to give all else besides. Since everything indeed belongs to God, he who possesses God wants for nothing, if he himself is not found wanting before God.

Teresa of Avila
Teresa of Avila was a Mystic and is a Doctor of the Church.  God as the Sole Satisfier of human longing is one of the central teachings of the Discalced Carmelite reform that she and St. John of the Cross collaborated upon in the 16th century.

Let nothing trouble you

Let nothing frighten you

Everything passes

God never changes

Patience

Obtains all

Whoever has God

Wants for nothing

God alone is enough.

See also 

Eastern Catholicism
Eastern Orthodoxy
Fall of man
Foolishness for Christ
Hermit
Hesychasm
Kenosis
Theosis

Notes

Attributes of God in Christian theology